Pauline Anna Milder-Hauptmann (13 December 1785 – 29 May 1838) was an operatic soprano.

Biography

Early life 
Milder was born in Constantinople where her father, Felix Milder from Salzburg, was employed by the Austrian ambassador Baron Herbert von Rathkeal as pastry chef; her mother was lady-in-waiting to the ambassador's wife. When Anna was five years old, the family left for Bucharest, where Felix worked as translator until they had to leave because of the Austro-Turkish War (1787–1791). After he had briefly worked for the ambassador again, the family returned to Bucharest, only to be forced to flee again when pestilence broke out there. After quarantine in Herrmannstadt, the family settled in Vienna. 

Here Anna, now aged 10, received her first formal education which included the German language she had not spoken before despite being fluent in French, Italian, modern Greek and Romanian. She became exposed to opera and church music, and begged her parents to let her receive a musical education. After some initial, and inadequate, teaching by the local schoolmaster, Sigismund von Neukomm, heard her and began teaching the 16-year-old for two years. On Emanuel Schikaneder's advice, she also studied with Salieri.

Early career 

Schikaneder had opened the Theater an der Wien in 1801 and Josepha Weber, Mozart's sister-in-law, negotiated on Neukomm's behalf for a position for Anna in that theatre. Milder was engaged for 500 florins, and made her stage debut there as Juno in Süßmayr's opera Der Spiegel von Arkadien on 9 April 1803, aged 19. Soon she gained major roles and changed to the Theater am Kärntnertor for a contract worth 2,000 florins. In 1805, she sang the title role in the first performance of Beethoven's Leonore, and again in the second and third versions in 1806 and 1814, when in the final revision its title was permanently changed to Fidelio. Luigi Cherubini wrote his German opera Faniska for her in 1806. She was intended to sing Beethoven's concert aria "Ah, perfido!", Op. 65, at his momentous Academy Concert on 22 December 1808 (when the Fifth and Sixth Symphonies, Fourth Piano Concerto and Choral Fantasia were heard for the first time under the composer's direction), but following a quarrel between Beethoven and Peter Hauptmann, Milder's soon-to-be husband, she refused and was replaced by a Dem. Josephine Killitschky.

1809–1813 
In 1809, Napoleon was so impressed by her performance in Martín's opera Una cosa rara and other works that he invited her to Paris, but she refused due to her impending marriage to Viennese jeweler Peter Hauptmann in 1810. Peter Hauptmann (1763-1858) maintained at this time his own house theater in the Trattnerhof. The marriage was not happy, they had a daughter in 1811 and later the couple lived separately. She contributed to the success of Joseph Weigl's Das Waisenhaus (1808) and, as Emmeline, Die Schweizer Familie (1809). Her performance in Gluck's Iphigénie en Tauride in 1812 was largely responsible for the Gluck revival in Vienna and Berlin. She sang in the first Vienna performance of Cherubini's Médée in 1812. In 1812 and 1813, she toured Breslau, Berlin, Karsruhe, Stuttgart and Frankfurt.

1814–1838 

The Austrian currency fell sharply around 1814, and Milder-Hauptmann received offers for roles at the Berlin Court Opera. Accompanied by her sister Jeanette Antonie Bürde (b. 1799), an accomplished composer and pianist, she travelled to Berlin in May 1815 where she would stay for the next 14 years. Gaspare Spontini was music director at the Berlin Court Opera, and she sang the role of Statira in the first Berlin performance of his opera Olimpie in 1821 as well as in the premieres of his operas Nurmahal (as Namouna) in 1822 and Agnes von Hohenstaufen (as Irmengard) in 1827. She again sang in operas by Gluck and Weigl in Berlin, was appointed prima donna assoluta and became a member of the Sing-Akademie zu Berlin in 1821. On 11 March 1829, she sang in Mendelssohn's momentous revival of Bach's St Matthew Passion. Mendelssohn wrote the concert aria "Tutto è silenzio" in 1829 for her. Following a quarrel with Spontini, she left Berlin in 1829 and visited Russia, Sweden and Denmark. She then returned to Berlin, where she made her last public appearance in 1836.

She died in Berlin in 1838 and is buried on the Alter Domfriedhof St. Hedwig.

Other dedications
Joseph Haydn, whose pupil Neukomm was, remarked on Milder's voice, "it's like a house", and Georg August Griesinger described it "like pure metal". Johann Friedrich Reichardt said Milder's voice was the most beautiful he had heard since Elisabeth Mara's. Goethe was deeply moved by Milder's performance when he heard her in 1823 in Marienbad; on the occasion of Milder's 25th stage anniversary on 9 April 1828, he sent her a dedicated copy of his play Iphigenia in Tauris. Similarly, after a successful production of Gluck's Alceste, the composer's nephew presented Milder with a miniature painting of Gluck and the score of Alceste. Milder was however criticised for a lack of vocal agility. Schubert said: "her voice is the best, her trills are the worst." Generally, her performances of works by Rossini were disliked by critics.

Many composers dedicated works to Milder-Hauptmann, including Bernhard Klein, Neukomm, Carl Blum, Conradin Kreutzer, Joseph Wolfram, . Among the more notable works are:

Kreutzer wrote his monodrama Adele von Budoy (1821, in 1823 revived as Cordelia with Wilhelmine Schröder-Devrient) for Milder. Franz Schubert wrote the lied "Der Hirt auf dem Felsen", D. 965, for Milder-Hauptmann which she premiered in Riga on 10 February 1830 and later that year also sang in Berlin. Milder had previously premiered Schubert's song "Die Forelle" and he had in 1824 dedicated the lied "Suleika II", D. 717, to her; the role of Estrella in his opera Alfonso und Estrella was designed for her, but the opera was never performed during Schubert's lifetime. The Allgemeine musikalische Zeitung (XVI, 1814, col. 315) wrote: "Happy those for whom works are written!" ("Wohl denen, für die eigens componiert wird!").

Notes

References

: Tonkünstler-Lexicon Berlin's, Berlin, 1861, p. 375

1785 births
1838 deaths
Expatriates from the Holy Roman Empire in the Ottoman Empire
Sopranos from the Austrian Empire
Women opera singers from the Austrian Empire